The 2001–02 Ligat Nashim was the fourth season of women's league football under the Israeli Football Association.

The league was won by Maccabi Haifa.

League table

References

External links
League Tables Over the Years Women's Football in Israel (via Internet Archive)
2001-2002 Women's League One.co.il 
Israel (Women) 1999/00 rsssf.com (partial table)

Ligat Nashim seasons
1
women
Israel